The Institute of Islamic Culture is an independent non-governmental institute and publishing house of Islamic studies in Lahore, Pakistan. It was established in Lahore in 1950 for the purpose of conducting scientific and research studies on various aspects of Islamic civilization and culture. Dr. Khalifa Abdul Hakeem was its founder director.

Directors
Khalifa Abdul Hakim (1950 – 30 January 1959)
M. M. Sharif (1959 - )
S. M. Ikram (1 July 1966 – 17 January 1973)
Muhammad Ishaq Bhatti
S. A. Rahman

References

1950 establishments in Pakistan
Islamic studies
Organisations based in Lahore
Islamic organisations based in Pakistan